Isoko people are an ethnolinguistic group who inhabit the Isoko region of Delta State and Bayelsa State, Nigeria. They are people of southern Nigeria, near the northwestern Niger delta. Delta State and Bayelsa State are part of the 36 states of the Federal Republic of Nigeria.

The Isokos speak the Isoko language, a language of the Kwa branch of the Niger-Congo family which is also very linguistically similar to the Urhobo language, Epie-Atissa language, Engenni language. James W. Welch asserted that Isoko language is a dialect of Urhobo language, and many people share that opinion.

The Isoko culture is related to several cultures in the Niger-Delta - namely, Urhobo, Ijaw and Anioma. Urhobo are related in language and culture, leading to the invaders erroneously labelling the Urhobo and Isoko cultural groups as Sobo. This name was strongly rejected by both tribes.

The Isoko ethnic group consist of nineteen clans namely: Uzere, Ozoro, Erowha, Owhe, Iyede, Okpe, Emede, Igbide, Emevor, Ofagbe, Ellu, Oyede, Umeh, Irri, Aviara, Olomoro, Enwhe, Okpolo and Oleh.

Notable people
 Eva Alordiah, rap musician
 Don Jazzy, record producer
 Fred Amata, actor
 Jeta Amata, filmmaker
 Bovi, comedian
 Patience Oghogho Maseli, first female Deputy Director of Upstream Division at the Department of Petroleum Resources
 Evi Edna Ogholi, reggae musician
 Orezi, musician
 Daddy Showkey, garala singer
 Masai Ujiri, President and former GM of the Toronto Raptors
 Solid Star, musician
 Samuel Oboh, Canadian architect
Emily Eriarie Arhagba, first Vice Principal at the Petroleum Training Institute, Effurun, Delta State.
Frank Shell Ogodo (Stage Name: Funky Franky), Musician
Enate Oziwo (aka Onyx California), influencer

References

External links
 Isoko information
 Isoko History  - information about Isoko Society by Hon. Chief Clement O. Akugha

Ethnic groups in Nigeria